The Rideau Club is a private social club in Ottawa, Ontario. The club was founded in 1865 by Sir John A. Macdonald and Sir George-Étienne Cariter as a gentlemen's club, but since 1979 has been mixed-sex. For much of its history the club was populated primarily by parliamentarians. In 1876 the Rideau built its clubhouse at 84 Wellington Street, where it remained until the building burned down in 1979. Since the fire, the club has been located in the top floor of the Metropolitan Life Building at 99 Bank Street.

History 
The club building, located for years across the street from the Parliament Buildings, burned down in October 1979. The club is now located on the top floor of a downtown office tower on Bank Street. At the time of the fire, the Government of Canada was attempting to expropriate the club's property to serve as part of a future U.S. embassy.

It was reported to be the first club in Canada (and one of the first in North America) to disallow the use of the blackball tradition which allowed clubs to subtly discriminate against Jewish potential members, after succumbing to pressure from Prime Minister Lester B. Pearson, among others, to admit Louis Rasminsky, Governor of the Bank of Canada.

Similarly, in the 1970s, after seeing controversy over its all-male policy, the club allowed female members and at the same time removed restrictions on female guests. The lounge, located on the north side of the club, is named after its first female member, Jean Pigott. She was accepted to the Rideau Club in 1979, the same year as the fire.

Each room on the south side of the club is dedicated to a significant person in Canadian history. Most are named after former prime ministers of Canada, but one is named after Yousuf Karsh. It is filled with famous portraits taken by him and left to the Rideau Club after his death.

See also 

 List of gentlemen's clubs in Canada

References

Bibliography

External links

Buildings and structures in Ottawa
Burned buildings and structures in Canada
Gentlemen's clubs in Canada
Politics of Canada
Politics of Ontario